Chinenye Ochuba-Akinlade is a Nigerian beauty pageant titleholder.

Ochuba-Akinlade is the seventh of eight children and also a twin. She is an Igbo. Following completion of her secondary education at Regan Memorial Secondary School, she won the 2002 edition of the Most Beautiful Girl in Nigeria pageant while awaiting admission into university. Despite being a favourite for the Miss Universe 2002 crown, she failed to make the top ten, but fared better at Miss World, where she was a top ten finalist, as well as the African Continental Queen of Beauty.

Formerly a student at the University of Lagos, Ochuba-Akinlade completed her degree in Accounting and Financing at the University of Greenwich, London in 2008, graduating with a second class upper. She returned to Nigeria, where she married businessman Kunle Akinlade, and worked for oil company Exxon Mobil. Ochuba-Akinlade now has two children.

References

1980s births
Alumni of the University of Greenwich
Igbo beauty pageant contestants
Living people
Miss Universe 2002 contestants
Miss World 2002 delegates
Most Beautiful Girl in Nigeria winners
Nigerian twins
University of Lagos alumni
Fraternal twins